The Czech Republic is a long-term net-exporter of electricity. 97% -98% of oil used in the Czech Republic is imported.

The government's 2015 energy policy designates nuclear power as main source of energy and its share is projected to rise to between 46% and 58% by 2040. Coal-powered energy is planned to fall to 21%, while renewables would rise to 25% and gas range from 5 to 15%.

The updated energy strategy of 2019 envisions a gradual phase out of coal power share in total electricity generation from 2015's 46.2% down to 15.5% by 2040. The strategy sees nuclear energy as a non-carbon source of energy to be used during a slow transition to renewables in order to minimize the use of carbon-emitting fossil fuels that cause climate change. The increase in the share of nuclear, renewables and natural gas is to fill in the energy demand created by the impending gradual shutdowns of coal power stations. This 2015-approved energy strategy expects construction of an additional nuclear reactor in the Temelín Nuclear Power Station and another one in the Dukovany Nuclear Power Station with the possibility of further expansion to two reactors in each power station. The older station of the two, Dukovany, is to be expanded before Temelín. As of 2019, the financing models and contractor selection for the planned reactors are being negotiated by the government.

According to IEA the electricity use (gross production + imports – exports – transmission/distribution losses) in the Czech Republic in 2008 was 67 TWh.

Nuclear power

There are two nuclear power plants in the Czech Republic

Renewable energy

In 2010 there was photovoltaics (PV) solar power 1,953 MW - fourth top in the EU.

In 2010 there was  471 MW solar heating - 10th top in the EU.

In 2010 there was 215 MW wind power - 18th top in the EU.

See also
Renewable energy in the Czech Republic
Nuclear power in the Czech Republic

References

Industry in the Czech Republic
Electric power in the Czech Republic